The Greek Orthodox Church of the Virgin Mary Eleousa is on Derby Road, Nottingham. It is a Grade II listed building. The church provides liturgies on Sundays and acts as a hub for a community of Greeks, Greek Cypriots, British Cypriots, Greek students in Nottingham and other Orthodox Christians who live in Nottingham.

A church hall annex is used for a Greek community school. The church hall is also used to celebrate events in the calendar of saints and the liturgical year such as Easter, Christmas and other traditions of the Eastern Orthodox Church.

History

An independent congregational group was established in the early nineteenth century in St. James' Church, Standard Hill and were soon large enough to look for their own premises. The foundation was laid in June 1882 and Park Hill Congregational Church opened for worship in June 1883.  The architects were James Tait and John Langham of Leicester.

In 1972 the congregation joined the United Reformed Church but by 1979 the church was closed.

The building was then acquired by the Greek Orthodox Church. The Church is dedicated to the Presentation of Mary and celebrates on 21 November each year.

Organ

The church had a pipe organ by Bishop and Son dating from 1884 which was rebuilt by Roger Yates in the 1934. The organ was re-opened on Monday 22 October 1934 by Marcel Dupré.

Gallery

References

Virgin Mary Eleousa
Churches in Nottinghamshire
Churches completed in 1883
Congregational churches in Nottingham
Greek Orthodox churches in the United Kingdom